Shalyhyne is an urban-type settlement in Shostka Raion of Sumy Oblast in Ukraine. It is located on the banks of the Lapuha, a left tributary of the Kleven, in the drainage basin of the Dnieper. Shalyhyne hosts the administration of Shalyhyne settlement hromada, one of the hromadas of Ukraine. Population: 

Until 18 July 2020, Shalyhyne belonged to Hlukhiv Raion. The raion was abolished in July 2020 as part of the administrative reform of Ukraine, which reduced the number of raions of Sumy Oblast to five. The area of Hlukhiv Raion was merged into Shostka Raion.

Economy

Transportation
The settlement has access, via Hlukhiv, to Highway M02 which connects it with Kyiv and Chernihiv, and to the north, across the Russian border, with Oryol and Moscow.

This is a terminal station on a side line which branches off the main railway line connecting Moscow and Kyiv via Khutir Mykhailivskii. As of 2021, there was no passenger traffic.

References

Urban-type settlements in Shostka Raion